GYS may refer to:

People 
 Gys van Beek (1919–2015), Dutch resistance member during World War II
 Leda Gys (1892–1957), Italian film actress
 Robert Gys (1901–1977), French art director

Other uses 
 Glycogen synthase
 Great Yorkshire Show
 Guangyuan Panlong Airport, Sichuan, China
 Operation GYS, an Israeli operation conducted during the 1948 Arab–Israeli War